Lycoctonine is a plant alkaloid and a precursor to the ABC ring system of taxoids.  Distinguish from lycaconitine, which is the N-succinimido-benzoic-ester.

External links

Pyrrolidine alkaloids
Taxanes